King Sumitra was the last ruler of Suryavamsha dynasty of Kosala kingdom. Who was defeated by the emperor Mahapadma Nanda of Magadha in 362 or 345 BCE. However, he was not killed, and fled to Rohtas, located in present-day Bihar.

References

4th-century BC Indian monarchs